Sharon Hanson-Lowery (born September 24, 1965, in Lake Charles, Louisiana) is an American former heptathlete. Her personal best score was 6352 points, achieved in 1996.

Achievements

References
 Sharon Hanson profile at USATF

1965 births
Living people
American heptathletes
Athletes (track and field) at the 1991 Pan American Games
Athletes (track and field) at the 1996 Summer Olympics
Olympic track and field athletes of the United States
Sportspeople from Lake Charles, Louisiana
Pan American Games medalists in athletics (track and field)
Pan American Games silver medalists for the United States
Medalists at the 1991 Pan American Games
21st-century American women